Charles Walemon "Cotton" Price (May 31, 1918 – September 24, 2008) was an American football quarterback, running back and defensive back. He attended Newcastle High School in Newcastle, Texas. He played college football at Texas A&M University and went on to play four seasons in the National Football League and All-America Football Conference. Price made the Pro Bowl in 1940.

References

External links

1918 births
2008 deaths
American football running backs
Texas A&M Aggies football players
Detroit Lions players
Miami Seahawks players
People from Bridgeport, Texas